Abhijeet Garg (born 26 December 1995) is an Indian cricketer. He made his first-class debut for Punjab in the 2018–19 Ranji Trophy on 6 December 2018. He made his List A debut on 9 October 2019, for Punjab in the 2019–20 Vijay Hazare Trophy.

References

External links
 

1995 births
Living people
Indian cricketers
Place of birth missing (living people)
Punjab, India cricketers